In Greek mythology, the Pegaeae were a type of naiad that lived in springs. They were often considered great aunts of the river gods (Potamoi), thus establishing a mythological relationship between a river itself and its springs.

List of Pegaeae
The number of Pegaeae included but was not limited to:

References

Sources
Theoi Project - Naiades

Naiads